Goneplax is a genus of crabs, containing the following extant species:
Goneplax barnardi (Capart, 1951)
Goneplax clevai Guinot & Castro, 2007
Goneplax rhomboides (Linnaeus, 1758)
Goneplax sigsbei (A. Milne-Edwards, 1880)
A further five species are also known from the fossil record, dating from the Miocene onwards.

References

Goneplacoidea
Extant Miocene first appearances